Penki may refer to:
Penki, Perm Krai
Penki, Vladimir Oblast
Penki (album)